= Saint Stephen the Great =

Saint Stephen the Great may refer to:

- Stephen I of Hungary
- Stephen III of Moldavia
